Democratic Alliance (Alliance démocratique, AD) was a short-lived political party in Quebec, Canada, founded by the Montreal journalist and politician Nick Auf der Maur. This left-of-centre political party was mainly based among the anglophone communities in Montreal.

The Democratic Alliance was closely linked with the Montreal Citizens' Movement, a political party at the municipal level. Bob Keaton, the DA’s candidate in Notre-Dame-de-Grâce riding had served as an MCM councilor on Montreal City Council. The DA presented a center-left platform that was described by the Montreal Gazette as being "complementary to that of the PQ though diametrically opposed on the issue of secession".

After the election, the DA was enthusiastic despite not winning any seats in the National Assembly and were planning to meet to discuss strategy for the next phase. The party’s best result was in Notre-Dame-de-Grâce riding where Bob Keaton placed a close third behind the Liberals and the Union Nationale.

The party was disbanded shortly after the 1976 Quebec general election, in which it won 0.53% of the popular vote.

Election results

See also 
 Politics of Quebec
 List of Quebec general elections
 List of Quebec premiers
 List of Quebec leaders of the Opposition
 National Assembly of Quebec
 Timeline of Quebec history
 Political parties in Quebec

References

External links 
 National Assembly historical information
 La Politique québécoise sur le Web

1976 disestablishments in Quebec
Defunct provincial political parties in Quebec
Political parties disestablished in 1976
Year of establishment missing